An expo is a trade exposition. It may also refer to:

Events and venues
 World's fair, a large international public exposition
 Singapore Expo, convention and exposition venue
 Expo Axis, one of the world's largest membrane roofs, constructed for the 2010 Shanghai Expo 
 Expo MRT station, part of the Singapore MRT Changi Airport Extension, built to handle fluctuating passenger volumes due to events at the adjacent Singapore Expo
 Expo Tel Aviv, convention and exhibition venue
 Floriade Expo, an international exhibition and garden festival in the Netherlands

Arts, entertainment, and media

Music
 Expo (album), a 2005 album by Robert Schneider/Marbles
 Expo (Magnus Lindberg), a 2009 10-minute musical composition by Magnus Lindberg
 Expo (Stockhausen), a 1970 composition for three players by Karlheinz Stockhausen

Other arts, entertainment, and media
 Expo (magazine), a Swedish anti-fascist magazine
 Expo Channel, a home shopping channel in Australia
 Windows Live Expo (codenamed Fremont), a former online classified ads website and social media marketplace

Brands and enterprises
 Expo Design Center, a chain of high end home furnishing and decor stores owned by The Home Depot
 Expo Dry Erase Products, Sanford Corp's brand of dry erase markers
 LG eXpo, a mobile phone

Other uses
Montreal Expos, a baseball team located in Montreal from 1969 to 2004

See also

Exhibition (disambiguation)
Expo Center (disambiguation)
Exposition (disambiguation)
Expository